Gonuiyeh (also Romanized as Gonū’īyeh and Gonavīyeh; also known as Gonū) is a village in Lay Siyah Rural District, in the Central District of Nain County, Isfahan Province, Iran. At the 2006 census, its population was 8, in 4 families.

References 

Populated places in Nain County